Nechayevka is a rural locality (a selo) in Usmanskoye 2-ye Rural Settlement of Novousmansky District of Voronezh Oblast, Russia, located  west from the district's administrative center Novaya Usman, near the  road. Population: 187 (2005 est.).

By the Law of Voronezh Oblast #93-OZ of October 27, 2008, the status of Nechayevka was changed from a settlement to a selo.

References

Notes

Sources

Rural localities in Novousmansky District